Casparus Johan "C. Johan" Bakkes (born 21 October 1956, Stellenbosch) is a noted South African writer. He is the son of Cas and the Margaret Bakkes and the brother of Christiaan Bakkes, Marius and Matilde Bakkes.

He is married to artist Nanna Vorster-Bakkes. Aqualified Chartered Accountant (SA), he is also a full-time professor at the University of the Western Cape in Cape Town, where he lectures Management Accounting.

Bakkes has garnered much controversy for often including offensive and exaggerated remarks towards members of his own family. Much controversy emerged from  his book "To Hell and Gone" (2008) when he put forward the argument that one of his nephews should not have had the right to be born in South Africa. In the same book, he also expressed that members of his family "betrayed" South Africa in moving to Canada because of the crime and racial tensions associated with South Africa. These conditions were wide-spread throughout South Africa, especially after the South African farm attacks had begun in the mid-90's.

Works
His published works consist of essays, most dealing with his travel experiences.
Moer toe die vreemde in (2001)
Nou's ons in ons donner (2006)
To Hell and Gone (2008) (an English translation of the essays contained in the two books above)
Nørrevøk (2008)
samoe(r)sa reis (2010)
Oepse Daisy (2011)
Openbaring (2016)

References

1956 births
Living people
South African writers
People from Stellenbosch